The National Unity Party or State Camp  is an Israeli political alliance made up of Benny Gantz’s Blue and White party and Gideon Sa'ar’s New Hope party, as well as former IDF Chief of Staff Gadi Eizenkot.

The alliance was created to participate in the 2022 Israeli legislative election.

History

Gantz and Sa'ar announced an alliance between their two parties on 10 July, which was initially called Blue and White The New Hope. The alliance was joined by former IDF Chief of Staff Gadi Eizenkot and former Yamina MK Matan Kahana on 14 August, at which point it was renamed the National Unity Party. Yamina MK Shirly Pinto joined the party on 22 August.

Composition

Leaders

Knesset election results

References

Liberal parties in Israel
Political party alliances in Israel
Political parties established in 2022
Zionist political parties in Israel
2022 establishments in Israel